Malá Hraštice is a municipality and village in Příbram District in the Central Bohemian Region of the Czech Republic. It has about 1,100 inhabitants.

Administrative parts
The village of Velká Hraštice is an administrative part of Malá Hraštice.

References

Villages in Příbram District